The Women's giant slalom competition of the Lake Placid 1980 Olympics was held at Whiteface Mountain on February 20–21.

The defending world champion was Maria Epple of West Germany, while West Germany's Christa Kinshofer was the defending World Cup giant slalom champion and Liechtenstein's Hanni Wenzel led the 1980 World Cup.

Results

References 

Women's giant slalom
Alp
Oly